The 1931 Philadelphia mayoral election saw the return of J. Hampton Moore to the mayors office.

Results

References

1931
Philadelphia
1931 Pennsylvania elections
1930s in Philadelphia